The Chief of Staff of the Army (JEME) is a military office held by a four-star general in the Spanish Army. Because of this, the JEME is the principal advisor to the Chief of the Defence Staff (JEMAD) on ground warfare and it is also an advisor to the Minister of Defence, the Secretary of State for Defence (SEDEF) and the Under-Secretary of Defence (SUBDEF).

Under the authority of the defence minister, the Chief of Staff of the Army exercises command over the land branch of the Armed Forces.

The JEME has two main roles: the support role by which advice is provided to the Minister of Defence about land military policy, the JEMAD about how to use the personnel and their operative status, the SEDEF about the economic, armament and infrastructure policies and the Under Secretary about the personnel and teaching policy, and the operative role to prepare the force for combat, instruct military personnel, establishes the organization of its military branch and watches over the welfare of the personnel under his command and evaluates the needs of the Army.

The Chief of the Staff of the Army convenes the meetings and coordinates the efforts of the Army Staff (EME), the main support body to the JEME responsible for providing the necessary elements of judgment to base its decisions, translate these into orders and ensure their fulfillment. The EME has a whole body of military officers at its service, and among the main officers include the Second Chief of Staff of the Army, the General Chief of the Terrestrial Headquarters of High Availability, the Chief of the Land Force and the General Chief of the Command of Personnel of the Army, among others.

The position is currently held by Army General Francisco Javier Varela Salas.

History
The creation of an Army Staff (Estado Mayor Central del Ejército) (EMCE) was planned on the Law of 17 July 1904 by which the Ministry of War was authorized to modify its structure. On December 13, 1904, the Minister of War approved a Regulation developing that structure and creating the Army Staff and in front of it a chief of staff. The JEME needed to be a lieutenant general and at the same time was created the office of the Second Chief of Staff of the Army with the rank of divisional general. On May 30, 1907, the National Defence Board and the JEME was part of it.

The EMCE was suppressed on December 29, 1912 and it was replaced by a section called Section of Army Staff and Campaign and the powers of the JEME were assumed by the Under Secretary of War.

The need to recover the Army Staff did not take long to appear and in November 1915 the Council of Ministers approved the draft bill of the Army Staff that was approved by the Cortes Generales and on January 26, 1916 the EMCE was re-created with mere technical functions, because it had no executive functions and was only granted such in times of war.

In this new law the position was reserved to captain general or lieutenant general officers and in times of war it was granted to the JEME total command of the Army unless the King put himself in charge of it. The JEME was indistinctly titled Chief of the Army Staff or General Chief of the Army Staff.

In 1925, the EMCE was once again suppressed and the functions of the JEME were assumed directly by the Minister of War, and the Directorate-General of Campaign Preparation, which served as the Army Staff, was created. It was recovered by the provisional government of the second republic in July 1931.

During the Civil War, as with the rest of the military branches, each side created its own General Staff. With the end of the civil war, the Francoist government maintained the structure of the Army Staff that existed previously, and did not change until the arrival of democracy, which changed the name of Chief of the Central Staff of the Army to Chief of Staff of the Army in 1977.

List of Chiefs of Staff of the Army

|-style="text-align:center;"
! colspan=6| Office suppressed between 1912 and 1916

|-style="text-align:center;"
! colspan=6| Office suppressed between 1925 and 1931

|-style="text-align:center;"
! colspan=6| Civil War

|-style="text-align:center;"
! colspan=6| End of the Civil War

See also
 Chief of the Defence Staff
 Chief of Staff of the Navy
 Chief of Staff of the Air Force
Ministers of Defence
 Captain general of the Army
 Spanish Army

Notes

References

Military of Spain
Spain